Olena Kozharko was crowned Miss Earth Ukraine 2014 and will compete in the Miss Earth 2014.

References

External links
 Miss Earth Official Website
 https://www.facebook.com/pages/Missosology-Lebanon/603849643041990?fref=ts

Ukrainian beauty pageant winners
Living people
Year of birth missing (living people)